The Modern could be
 The Modern (band), a British Electropop band formerly called Matinée Club
 The Modern (building complex), a twin tower complex in Fort Lee, New Jersey
 The Modern (restaurant), a Danny Meyer restaurant in the Museum of Modern Art in New York City
 The Modern Art Museum of Fort Worth, referred to colloquially as "The Modern"